Walter Allison Hurley (born May 30, 1937) is a Canadian-born prelate of the Roman Catholic Church.

Hurley served as auxiliary bishop of the Archdiocese of Detroit in Michigan from 2003 to 2005 and as bishop of the Diocese of Grand Rapids in Michigan from 2005 to 2018. Hurley served as apostolic administrator of the Diocese of Gaylord and the Diocese of Saginaw, both in Michigan.

Biography

Early life and education 
Walter Hurley was born on May 30, 1937, in Fredericton, New Brunswick, to Charles and Anne (née Ball) Hurley. One of six children, he has four sisters, Elizabeth, Eileen, Charlene, and Annette; and one brother, Gerald. He attended St. Dunstan Grade School in Fredericton, and St. Anne High School in Church Point, Nova Scotia.

In 1955, Hurley immigrated to the United States, settling in Detroit. He earned a Bachelor of Arts degree from Sacred Heart Seminary in Detroit in 1961, and a Master of Divinity degree from St. John's Provincial Seminary in Plymouth, Michigan, in 1965.

Priesthood 
Hurley was ordained to the priesthood of the Archdiocese of Detroit by then Archbishop John Dearden on June 5, 1965, serving the following  parish appointments in the archdiocese:
 Pastoral vicar at St. Dorothy in Warren (1965–1969)
 Vicar for the Warren-Centerline Vicariate (1969–1972)
 Pastor of St. Cyprian in Riverview (1972–1976)
 Pastor of Sacred Heart in Roseville (1976–1979)
 Pastor of St. Lucy in St. Clair Shores (1979–1982)
Cardinal Edmund Szoka then sent Hurley to further his studies at the Catholic University of America in Washington, D.C., where he obtained a Licentiate of Canon Law in 1984. Upon returning to Detroit, Hurley served in three more appointments:
 Judicial vicar of the metropolitan tribunal (1984–1989)
 Diocesan moderator of the curia (1986–1990)
 Pastor of Our Lady of Sorrows Parish in Farmington, Michigan (1990–2003)
In 1994, Pope John Paul II named Hurley an honorary prelate of his holiness, giving him the title of monsignor. That year, he also became a member of the Equestrian Order of the Holy Sepulchre of Jerusalem.

Hurley served as Cardinal Adam Maida's delegate for clergy misconduct from 1988 to 1995 and again from 2002 to 2005.  Hurley also served as the cardinal's delegate and project manager for the construction of the Saint John Paul II National Shrine in Washington, D.C., from 1995 to 2001.

Auxiliary Bishop of Detroit 
On July 7, 2003, Pope John Paul II appointed Hurley as the 22nd auxiliary bishop of the Archdiocese of Detroit and titular bishop of Chunavia. Cardinal Maida performed his episcopal consecration on August 12, 2003, with Cardinal Szoka and Bishop Walter Schoenherr serving as co-consecrators. At that time, Hurley selected "Serve With Gladness" (from Psalm 100:2) as his episcopal motto. As an auxiliary bishop, he was responsible for the Northwest Region of the archdiocese, which encompasses Oakland and Lapeer Counties.

Bishop of Grand Rapids
On June 21, 2005,  Pope Benedict XVI named Hurley as the 11th bishop of the Diocese of Grand Rapids. He was installed on August 4, 2005.

Resignation 
As required, Hurley submitted his resignation to Pope Benedict XVI on his 75th birthday, May 30, 2012.  However, Pope Francis only accepted the resignation on April 18, 2013, when he appointed Reverend David Walkowiak as the new bishop of Grand Rapids. During the period between his resignation and Walkowiak's installation, Hurley served as apostolic administrator of the diocese

Apostolic administrator
On October 17, 2018, following the sudden death of Bishop Joseph Cistone on October 16, Pope Francis named Hurley as the apostolic administrator of the Diocese of Saginaw.  Hurley served in Saginaw until July 2019. On June 23, 2020, Pope Francis chose Hurley as the apostolic administrator of the Diocese of Gaylord.  Hurley held this position until the consecration of Reverend Jeffrey Walsh as bishop on March 4, 2022.

See also
 

 Catholic Church hierarchy
 Catholic Church in the United States
 Historical list of the Catholic bishops of the United States
 List of Catholic bishops of the United States
 Lists of patriarchs, archbishops, and bishops

References

External links
Roman Catholic Diocese of Grand Rapids Official Site

Episcopal succession

People from Fredericton
1937 births
Living people
Catholic University of America alumni
Canadian emigrants to the United States
Sacred Heart Major Seminary alumni
Roman Catholic bishops of Grand Rapids
21st-century Roman Catholic bishops in the United States
Canadian people of Irish descent
Roman Catholic Archdiocese of Detroit